Two-time defending champion Diede de Groot and her partner Aniek van Koot defeated Sabine Ellerbrock and Kgothatso Montjane in the final, 6–2, 6–0 to win the women's doubles wheelchair tennis title at the 2019 US Open. With the win, they completed the Grand Slam, and van Koot completed the triple career Grand Slam.

De Groot and Yui Kamiji were the defending champions, but did not compete together. Kamiji partnered Giulia Capocci, but was defeated in the semifinals by de Groot and van Koot.

Seeds

Draw

Bracket

External links 

 Draw

Wheelchair Women's Doubles
U.S. Open, 2019 Women's Doubles